Croghan may refer to:

Places

Ireland

 Croghan (village), County Offaly, Ireland
 Croghan, County Roscommon, Ireland
 Croghan Hill, a  hill in County Offaly, Ireland
 Croghan Mountain, a  peak in the Wicklow Mountains, Ireland

United States

 Croghan (town), New York
 Croghan (village), New York
 Mount Croghan, South Carolina

People
 Davis Croghan (1832–1890), priest
 George Croghan
 John Croghan (1790–1849), physician
 Mark Croghan (born 1968), American middle-distance runner